The 1991 Soviet Chess Championship was the 58th and last edition of USSR Chess Championship. It was held from 1–13 November 1991 in Moscow. The title was won by the Armenian Artashes Minasian.

Crosstable  
The 58th and final Championship produced perhaps the greatest surprise of the whole series. There were a few big names in the field at Moscow, which was run as an 11-round Swiss system with 64 players. For example, there was Mikhail Tal, but he was seriously ill and finished only 39th-46th on 5 points. Leonid Yudasin, soon to emigrate to Israel, also finished with 5. Alexey Shirov got only 6½. Two little-known players shared the top with 8½, but the title went to the 24-year-old Armenian Artashes Minasian who had met much the stronger opposition and so having a better tiebreak, while Elmar Magerramov from Baku was second.

References 

USSR Chess Championships
1991 in chess
1991 in Soviet sport